The canton of Saint-Lubin-des-Joncherets is an administrative division of the Eure-et-Loir department, northern France. It was created at the French canton reorganisation which came into effect in March 2015. Its seat is in Saint-Lubin-des-Joncherets.

It consists of the following communes:
 
Ardelles
Beauche
Bérou-la-Mulotière
Boissy-lès-Perche
Le Boullay-les-Deux-Églises
Brezolles
La Chapelle-Fortin
Châtaincourt
Châteauneuf-en-Thymerais
Les Châtelets
Crucey-Villages
Dampierre-sur-Avre
Digny
Escorpain
Favières
La Ferté-Vidame
Fessanvilliers-Mattanvilliers
Fontaine-les-Ribouts
La Framboisière
Jaudrais
Lamblore
Laons 
Louvilliers-lès-Perche
Maillebois
La Mancelière
Le Mesnil-Thomas
Montigny-sur-Avre
Morvilliers
Prudemanche
La Puisaye
Puiseux
Les Ressuintes
Revercourt
Rohaire
Rueil-la-Gadelière
Saint-Ange-et-Torçay
Saint-Jean-de-Rebervilliers
Saint-Lubin-de-Cravant
Saint-Lubin-des-Joncherets
Saint-Maixme-Hauterive
Saint-Rémy-sur-Avre
Saint-Sauveur-Marville
La Saucelle
Senonches
Serazereux
Thimert-Gâtelles
Tremblay-les-Villages

References

Cantons of Eure-et-Loir